Kara-Bulak is a village in the Kemin District, Chüy Region, Kyrgyzstan. Its population was 1,087 in 2021. It is the center of Kara-Bulak rural community (ayyl aymagy) that also includes the villages Beysheke, Altymysh and Chüy. Among famous people born in Kara-Bulak are academician Arstanbek Altymyshev, composer and singer Abdylas Moldobaev, singer Kaiyrgul Sartbaeva, and composer Nasyr Davlesov.

References

Populated places in Chüy Region